André Joseph Lemaire (6 March 1759 – 24 October 1802) was a French general of artillery during the French Revolutionary Wars. He served in Jean-Baptiste Jourdan's Army of the Danube in the invasion of southwestern Germany in 1799. He retired after the Treaty of Lunéville in 1800 and died in 1802.

Bibliography  
 Karl Bleibtreu: Marschälle, Generäle, Soldaten Napoleons I: VRZ-Verlag, Hamburg 1999,  (Nachdr. d. Ausg. Berlin 1899). 
 Pierre Daudruy: Le général de division André Joseph Lemaire et sa descendance. Dunkerque 1951. 
 

1759 births
1802 deaths
French military personnel of the French Revolutionary Wars
French generals
Names inscribed under the Arc de Triomphe